Harold Arthur Crockford (25 September 1893 – 15 December 1983) was an English professional footballer who played as a forward in the Football League for Fulham, Exeter City, Port Vale, Chesterfield, Gillingham, Accrington Stanley, Walsall, Darlington and Norwich City.

Career
Before and during the First World War, Crockford played for Chatham, Vicar of Wakefield and as a guest for Watford, Clapton Orient, Brentford and Southampton. Crockford joined Fulham in 1919 and scored 9 goals in 26 appearances during the 1919–20 and 1920–21 Second Division seasons, though he once missed the team bus for an away match at bury in April 1920. Crockford transferred to Exeter City during the 1922 off-season and scored 17 goals in 30 Third Division South appearances to finish as the club's top-scorer. He scored hat-tricks in matches against Reading and Newport County.

Crockford transferred to Port Vale in May 1923. He scored on his debut on 25 August, in a 2–1 victory over Crystal Palace at the Nest and scored again two days later in a 2–0 win over Sheffield Wednesday at The Old Recreation Ground. However, Vale lost the next four Second Division matches of the 1923–24 season and he left by mutual consent the next month due to his poor form, to be replaced by Tom Butler. Crockford moved on to play for Chesterfield, where he scored on his debut in a 4–0 win over Southport on 6 October 1923. He later played for Gillingham, Accrington Stanley, Walsall, Darlington, Norwich City, Bedford Town and Tunbridge Wells Rangers between 1925 and 1929.

Personal life 
Crockford served in the Royal Field Artillery during the First World War. After retiring as a player, he worked as a turf accountant near Stamford Bridge.

Career statistics

References

Footballers from Derby
English footballers
Brentford F.C. wartime guest players
Fulham F.C. players
Exeter City F.C. players
Port Vale F.C. players
Chesterfield F.C. players
Gillingham F.C. players
Accrington Stanley F.C. (1891) players
Walsall F.C. players
Darlington F.C. players
Norwich City F.C. players
Bedford Town F.C. players
Tunbridge Wells F.C. players
English Football League players
1893 births
1983 deaths
British Army personnel of World War I
Royal Field Artillery soldiers
Bookmakers
Watford F.C. wartime guest players
Clapton Orient F.C. wartime guest players
Southampton F.C. wartime guest players
Association football forwards
Association football inside forwards